The Australian Railway Historical Society (ARHS) aims to foster an interest in the railways, and record and preserve many facets of railway operations. It had divisions in every state and the Australian Capital Territory, although the ACT division was wound up in 2016, along with the Victorian division in 2020. Since 1967, when each division incorporated, the state divisions have operated as separate entities. Each still trades under the ARHS brand, except in Western Australia, where the division is called Rail Heritage WA. Individual membership exceeds 2,500.

Background
The ARHS was founded in Sydney in 1933 as The Railway Circle, becoming the Australasian Railway and Locomotive Historical Society shortly afterwards. The society's name was changed to the present form in 1952. Divisions were later formed in most states, most of which established a railway museum, namely:

ACT - Canberra Railway Museum, Kingston
Queensland - Rosewood Railway Museum
South Australia - SteamRanger operates the Victor Harbor line as a working museum
Victoria - Australian Railway Historical Society Museum, Williamstown North
Western Australia - Western Australian Rail Transport Museum, Bassendean
In February 2015, the ACT division commenced operating scrap metal services from Fyshwick to Port Botany through its commercial division, Espee Railroad Services, with locomotives and wagons leased from CFCL Australia. In November 2016, the Canberra Railway Museum was suddenly closed after the commercial division, which had been started to subsidise popular but expensive heritage train trips, collapsed with more than $700,000 of debt. That led to the ACT Division of the ARHS being placed into liquidation.

In July 2020, the Victorian division was wound up, following a number of civil claims made against it by those who, as children, were abused by volunteers.

Both the Canberra Railway Museum (Capital Region Heritage Rail) and Newport Railway Museum are now run by organisations separate from the ARHS.

Railway Resource Centre
Located at the New South Wales division's Alexandria premises, The Railway Resource Centre is a collection of historical material pertaining to Australian railways, managed by the Society and volunteers. Access to the collection is available to members and to the general public for private research only. It houses thousands of documents, books, periodicals, photographs and slides which the Society has acquired over many years. It is constantly being added to by acquisitions through donations and bequests from Australian Railway Historical Society members and others.

Publications

Books

Each division has published and supported publishing of books and pamphlets about the history of regional railways. Significantly divisions have been the main resource of expertise in creating centenary and other anniversary publications regarding rail history. The New South Wales Division operates a shop in Alexandria. The society also maintains the Railway Resource Centre. The centre houses the thousands of documents, books, periodicals, photographs and slides that the society has acquired over many years.

Magazines
Each Division publishes magazines, at various frequencies. A dedicated magazine for the whole of Australia was also published for many decades - simply as the Bulletin (1952–2003), it is now called Australian Railway History. Prior to 1952, it was known as the Australasian Railway and Locomotive Historical Society Bulletin. It includes historical material from all states, published monthly by the New South Wales Division. The seven state and territory Divisions of that Society additionally publish magazines that vary in content and depth, but which provide items of local information about state railway history and activities.

NSW Division: Railway Digest, Australian Railway History
Queensland Division: Sunshine Express
SA Division: Newsletter
Tasmania Division: Tasmanian Rail News
Victorian Division: Members newsletter, Newsrail
WA Division: The Westland

The Tasmanian Division was originally a subdivision of the much larger Victorian Division, until 1965 when increasing interest and falling printing costs made a separate division possible.

Affiliations
Other societies and organisations with which the Australian Railway Historical Society is affiliated include:-

Australian Electric Traction Association
Canadian Railroad Historical Association
East Coast Heritage Rail
Irish Railway Record Society
Light Railway Research Society of Australia
Light Rail Transit Association (UK)
Narrow Gauge Railway Society (UK)
National Railway Historical Society (USA)
NSW Rail Museum
New Zealand Railway & Locomotive Society
Rail Motor Society
Railway Correspondence & Travel Society (UK)
Railway Society of Southern Africa
Royal Australian Historical Society

Other groups
Rail heritage is not the exclusive domain of the ARHS in Australia, and at various stages other groups of enthusiasts and individuals have endeavoured to create niches in the publishing and rail heritage businesses.

See also

List of railroad-related periodicals

References

Further reading

External links
ARHS ACT Division
ARHS New South Wales Division
ARHS Queensland Division
ARHS South Australian Division (SteamRanger)
ARHS Tasmanian Division
ARHS Victorian Division
ARHS Western Australian Division
Espee Railroad Services

Freight railway companies of Australia
Historical societies of Australia
Organizations established in 1933
Railway societies
Rail transport preservation in Australia
1933 establishments in Australia